Fleuré is a commune in the Vienne department in the Nouvelle-Aquitaine region in western France.

Geography

Localisation 
Commune of 1,000 inhabitants located 18 km southeast of Poitiers.

See also
Communes of the Vienne department

References

Communes of Vienne